Mystic Valley Parkway is a parkway in Arlington, Medford, Somerville, and Winchester, Massachusetts. It is listed on the National Register of Historic Places, and forms part of Route 16.

Route description

The parkway runs roughly north–south from the Middlesex Fells in Winchester, down the Aberjona River valley, and along the east side of the Mystic Lakes into Medford. This section follows the path of the old Middlesex Canal. It then crosses the Mystic River into Arlington (sharing a bridge with Massachusetts Route 60), and curves to follow the river as it runs east–west through Arlington. A short branch also runs along the southern shore of the Lower Mystic Lake from Route 60 where it ends at a junction with U.S. Route 3 and Massachusetts Route 2A. It meets Alewife Brook Parkway (and joins with Massachusetts Route 16) at a rotary near where Alewife Brook empties into the Mystic, and then continues to generally follow the course of the Mystic River downstream, crossing it several times before ending at Revere Beach Parkway where both meet Massachusetts Route 28.

History
The parkway, with surrounding landscape, forms part of Boston's Metropolitan Park District, established in 1893. The parkway itself was designed in 1894-1895 by the Olmsted Brothers, the noted landscape architects, with Charles Eliot taking a lead role. It was originally created as one section of a web of pleasure roads designed for their aesthetics, as part of a comprehensive plan for green spaces in and around Boston.

Lantern slides in the Library of Congress collection, Courtesy of the Frances Loeb Library, Graduate School of Design, Harvard University, offer views of the Parkways in published in 1895.

It now forms part of the Metropolitan Park System of Greater Boston, and on January 18, 2006, was added to the National Register of Historic Places as a historic district.

Major intersections

References

 Charles Eliot, "The Boston Metropolitan Reservations", The New England magazine, Volume 21, Issue 1, September 1896.
 William B. de las Casas, "The Boston Metropolitan Park System", Annals of the American Academy of Political and Social Science, Vol. 35, No. 2, Public Recreation Facilities (March, 1910), pp. 64–70.
 Charles William Eliot, Charles Eliot: Landscape Architect, Houghton, Mifflin, 1902.

External list

Parkways in Massachusetts
Transportation in Middlesex County, Massachusetts
Roads on the National Register of Historic Places in Massachusetts
Buildings and structures in Arlington, Massachusetts
Buildings and structures in Medford, Massachusetts
Buildings and structures in Somerville, Massachusetts
Buildings and structures in Winchester, Massachusetts
Transportation in Somerville, Massachusetts
Parks on the National Register of Historic Places in Massachusetts
National Register of Historic Places in Somerville, Massachusetts
Historic districts on the National Register of Historic Places in Massachusetts